The Archdeacon of Shetland was the head of the Archdeaconry of Shetland, a sub-division of the Diocese of Orkney in Scotland This archdeacon was one of the two archdeacons of the diocese, the other being the Archdeacon of Orkney. Next to the bishop, the Archdeacon of Shetland was the senior ecclesiastic in the diocese.

List of known archdeacons of Shetland
 Andrew, 1215
 Nicholas, 1226
 Gilbert, 1260-1263 (later Bishop of Hamar
 Peter, 1269-1270
 Sigurd, 1295
 William Johnson, 1360
 William Wood, x 1372
 William de Buchan, 1369 x 1372-1372 x 1383
 John Fule, 1372
 Walter de Buchan, 1383-1391
 Adam Easton, 1381 x 1385-1391 x 1396
 William de Lance, 1383
 Angus de Kirkness (Kerlues, Birknes),  1396-1429 x 1430
 David de Craigie (Cragy), 1420
 Malise de Tulloch, 1430-1445
 David Tulloch,  1457
 Thomas Tulloch, 1457
 John Sinclair, 1484-1484 x 1501
 James Sinclair, 1484
 William Turnbull, 1485-1487
 Henry Phankouth, 1501–1529.
 Mawnys Herwood, 1502
 Malcolm Halcro, 1529-1554
 Thomas Cheyne, 1572, 1584-1586
 William Hay, 1584-1628
 Alexander Cheyne, 1592
 John Mitchell, 1629

Notes

Bibliography
 Watt, D.E.R., Fasti Ecclesiae Scoticanae Medii Aevi ad annum 1638, 2nd edition, (St Andrews, 1969), pp. 261–3
 Smith, Brian, Archdeacons of Shetland 1195–1567, in Ecclesia Nidrosiensis 1153-1537, (Trondheim 2003)

Shetland
History of Shetland
People associated with Shetland
Roman Catholic clergy in Scotland